Tyrone Jeremy Grant (born January 24, 1977) is an American former professional basketball player of Barbadian descent. At a height of 2.02 m (6'7 ") tall, he played at the small forward and power forward positions. He was en explosive scorer and good rebounder.

College career
From 1995 to 1999, Grant played college basketball at St. John's University, with the  St. John's Red Storm.

Professional career
Grant started to Europe after that year, playing for a succession of sides including Mabo Prefabbricati Livorno, De Vizia Avellino, Teramo Basket, Armani Jeans Milano, VidiVici Bologna and Benetton Treviso in the Italian Serie A, Olympia Larissa in Greece and Leite Río Breogán in the Spanish Liga ACB.

Personal life
On December 13, 2010, Grant founded the non-profit organization Team First Inc. Team First Inc. provides academic and social support services to public schools within New York with their focus on high poverty communities.

References

External links
Italian League Profile  Retrieved 11 August 2015
Spanish League Profile  
RealGM Profile Retrieved 7 February 2015
Official Team First Inc. Website
1999 NBA Draft page for Tyrone Grant

1977 births
Living people
Basketball players from New York City
American men's basketball players
Barbadian men's basketball players
Basket Livorno players
CB Breogán players
Greek Basket League players
Ilysiakos B.C. players
Ironi Ashkelon players
Israeli Basketball Premier League players
Jeonju KCC Egis players
Lega Basket Serie A players
Liga ACB players
Olimpia Milano players
Olympia Larissa B.C. players
Pallacanestro Treviso players
Power forwards (basketball)
Reyer Venezia players
Small forwards
Sportspeople from Brooklyn
S.S. Felice Scandone players
St. John's Red Storm men's basketball players
Teramo Basket players
Trenton Shooting Stars players
Virtus Bologna players